The nuzhe ( or ) is an Azerbaijani string instrument. Nuzhe was made in base of çeng and qanun (instrument). Nuzhe, invented by prominent music expert Safi al-Din al-Urmawi.

See also 

 Safi al-Din al-Urmawi
 Mugni

Notes

External links

Azerbaijani musical instruments
Azerbaijani inventions
Box zithers